Beer floating (Kaljakellunta in Finnish) is an open and unofficial Finnish summer event. In the event, the participants float on the Kerava River or on the Vantaa River from Vantaa to a downstream riverside beach in Helsinki. The participants use small rubber crafts while equipping usually nothing more than a paddle and loads of beer. The event has no official organizers but instead the date is decided on online social forums such as Facebook. The Beer floating event is also organized in Oulu, where the participants float on the Oulu River.

The Beer floating event has been organized annually since 1997. There were under 10 participants in the first event in 1997 but ever since the number of participants has grown every year. In 2011, around 5,000 people participated in the event. The date of the Beer floating event has been varying but the most likely date is considered to be either the last weekend in July or the first weekend in August.

References

External links
www.kaljakellunta.org/en

Entertainment events in Finland
Recurring events established in 1997
Summer events in Finland
1997 establishments in Finland
Alcohol in Finland
Events in Finland